The Semantan MRT Station or Manulife–Semantan for sponsorship reasons, is a mass rapid transit (MRT) station that serves the suburb of Damansara Heights, Kuala Lumpur, Malaysia. It is one of the stations on the MRT Sungai Buloh-Kajang Line and was opened on 16 December 2016 when Phase One of the line became operational.

The station is located near the Semantan Interchange (Jalan Dungun intersection) of the Sprint Expressway near Wisma UN, the United Nations (UN) representative office in Malaysia and the office area of Jalan Dungun.

History
During Phase One operation of the MRT Sungai Buloh-Kajang Line, this station was the southern terminus of the line where all passengers had to disembark. Trains would leave the station and made a turn back at the cross-over track above Jalan Sultan Abdul Halim before heading back towards Sungai Buloh. With the opening of Phase Two on 17 July 2017, the southern terminus of the station became Kajang station.

From 21 August 2017, Manulife has been granted a 5-year contract for the naming rights of the station, which is located within 5 minutes walk from Menara Manulife, the Manulife Malaysia's headquarters.

Station features

Station layout

Exit and entrances 
The station has two entrances, Entrance A is located on the north side along Jalan Damansara Endah while Entrance B is located on the south side along Jalan Dungun opposite of Wisma UOA Damansara. Both of the entrances have bus stops for bus and feeder services.

Bus services

MRT Feeder Bus Services
With the opening of the MRT Sungai Buloh-Kajang Line, feeder buses also began operating linking the station with the Solaris Dutamas and Kuala Lumpur High Court area in Jalan Tuanku Abdul Halim (Jalan Duta). The feeder buses operate from the station's feeder bus stops adjacent to the station at the Jalan Dungun entrance (Entrance B) of the station.

With the closure of Entrance B for the  Pusat Bandar Damansara station, bus routes T818, T819, T820 and T852 will operate from this station bus stop until further notice.

Other Bus Services
The station is also served by RapidKL trunk buses at bus stops on either side of Jalan Semantan, and accessed via both entrances of the station. Semantan station is also served by a Kelana Jaya Line feeder bus route, connecting it with the Bangsar LRT station. The bus stop for the feeder bus is at Jalan Dungun, accessed via entrance B.

Gallery

References

External links
 Klang Valley Mass Rapid Transit website
 Unofficial information resource on the MRT

Rapid transit stations in Kuala Lumpur
Sungai Buloh-Kajang Line
Railway stations opened in 2016